The 1921–22 Prima Divisione season was won by Pro Vercelli.

The CCI Italian Football Championship was formed during the summer of 1921, as a result of a dispute between the Federazione Italiana Giuoco Calcio and the main teams.

The teams asked for a reduction of the number of participants in the First Category. Vittorio Pozzo, the Italian football coach, developed a plan to accommodate the teams' requests but, after a vote, the plan did not pass: the smaller clubs feared that they would disappear if such a reduction was introduced.

This led to the creation of a new Italian football federation, the CCI (Italian Football Confederation, in Italian Confederazione Calcistica Italiana), that organized a championship concurrent with the FIGC championship.

This separation only lasted one season and the following summer, FIGC accepted the proposal to reduce the number of participants and subsequently recognized the CCI championship as an official scudetto, alongside their own 1921–22 Prima Categoria (FIGC) that ran concurrently.

The CCI winner was S.G. Pro Vercelli.

Northern League
As a private league, the Northern League was composed by the 24 richest clubs of 1920–21 Prima Categoria.

Regular season
Group winners went to the final. Under original regulations, bottom clubs went to a test-match against the two best clubs of the Second Division.

Group A

Classification

Results table

Group B

Classification

Results table

Finals
Played on May 7 and 14, 1922.

Southern League

The Southern League was a separate amatorial league, still divided in five regions. The winner were Fortitudo Rome.

National Finals
Played on June 11 and 18, 1922.

Test-matches
Played on July 2, 1922.

(*) This match was invalidated due to a referee's technical error. The match was repeated a week later:

Played on July 9, 1922, in Legnano.

Vicenza were relegated to 1922–23 Seconda Divisione.

Internazionale received a walkover as their opponents Sport Club Nazionale Lombardia went bankrupt and disbanded.

Barrage 
The CCI was very rich but it suffered the lack of international recognition by the FIFA, so an agreement with the FIGC was found. On July 9 and 16, Inter and Derthona and the other four bottom clubs of the Northern League were challenged by six FIGC’s clubs.

Venezia was the sole CCI club to be relegated to the 1922–23 Seconda Divisione following the defeat by FIGC’s Rivarolese. Spezia was re-elected when CCI’s Livorno bought and merged with its FIGC's counterpart Pro Livorno, freeing a slot.

Extra matches 
After U.S. Livorno and Pro Livorno's merger, a spot in the Prima Divisione was freed and extra-rounds had to be organized.

Extra Round 1
Played on September 17, 1922.

Extra Round 2
Played on September 24, 1922, in Reggio Emilia.

References and sources
Almanacco Illustrato del Calcio - La Storia 1898-2004, Panini Edizioni, Modena, September 2005

Footnotes

1922b